Sawan Kankanamge (born 18 February 1999) is a Sri Lankan cricketer. He made his first-class debut for Lankan Cricket Club in Tier B of the 2018–19 Premier League Tournament on 31 January 2019. He made his List A debut for Lankan Cricket Club in the 2018–19 Premier Limited Overs Tournament on 4 March 2019.

References

External links
 

1999 births
Living people
Sri Lankan cricketers
Lankan Cricket Club cricketers
Place of birth missing (living people)